The Allenwood River Bridge was a historic bridge in Delaware Township, Northumberland County, Pennsylvania, and Gregg Township, Union County, Pennsylvania. The two-lane, five-span, pin-connected Pratt through truss bridge carried Pennsylvania Route 44 over the West Branch Susquehanna River. The bridge was one of the oldest and longest spans crossing that river. Its builder, in 1895, was the Groton Bridge and Manufacturing Company, a nationally prominent bridge manufacturer from 1877 through 1920.

It was listed on the National Register of Historic Places in 1988. In 1990 it was replaced with a concrete bridge.

Gallery

See also
List of bridges documented by the Historic American Engineering Record in Pennsylvania

References

External links

National Register of Historic Places

Pratt truss bridges in the United States
Bridges completed in 1895
Road bridges on the National Register of Historic Places in Pennsylvania
Historic American Engineering Record in Pennsylvania
Metal bridges in the United States
Bridges in Union County, Pennsylvania
Bridges in Northumberland County, Pennsylvania
National Register of Historic Places in Northumberland County, Pennsylvania
National Register of Historic Places in Union County, Pennsylvania